Lamane Jegan Joof (English spelling in the Gambia, Lamane Djigan Diouf French spelling in Senegal,  also : Ndigan Dieye Diouf, Djigan Diouf, Laman Jegaan Juuf or Jegaan Jaay Juuf in Serer language), was a Serer lamane who according to Serer tradition founded the Serer village of Tukar now part of present-day Senegal.  The Raan Festival (a major event in the Serer religious calendar) takes place each year at Tukar, two weeks after the appearance of the new moon in April.

Origins
According to the oral tradition of the Serer people, Jegan Joof migrated from Lambaye following a dispute with his relative, the king of Lambaye–Baol Teign Jinaax Jalaan Joof (or Teeñ Jinaax Jalaan Juuf). The dispute was about the governance of Lambaye and over-taxation. Jegan Joof who was also a mix-farmer and with a large cattle herd felt he was being overtaxed unjustly. He thus decided to migrate with his younger brother Ndik Joof in search of new land and territory to exploit, hence the founding of Tukar, presently, a rather large village which includes numerous other villages such as Njujuf, Ndokh, Sob, etc. They were former colonies of Tukar and part of Jegan's estate. The Joof family reigned in Tukar for several centuries, inherited from their ancestor Lamane Jegan Joof.
In the epic of Jegan Joof, he is reported to have had a son called Sosseh Joof (variation : Socé Diouf) who inherited his father's estate.  Ndik Joof, brother of Jegan, is reported to have died in Tukar before Jegan's own death. Jegan Joof belongs to the Patik matriclan—one of the many Serer maternal clans.

Land pawning
In 1937, a descendant of Jegan Joof called Biram Diouf pawned his family's estate to the Sene noble family of Sine.  It took his descendants 50 years to pay off the debt and regained their family estate.

Status in religion

In the Serer religion, the Raan Festival takes place once a year in Tukar, on the second Thursday after the new moon in April. In this festival, the Serer high priests and priestesses known as the Saltigues make offering of millets and wine to the shrine of Saint Luguuñ Joof.  This Holy Saint (or Pangool in Serer) is said to have guided Lamane Jegan Joof when he migrated from Lambaye in search of new land to exploit.

See also
Serer people
Joof family
Lamane
Kingdom of Baol
Kingdom of Sine
Kingdom of Saloum
States headed by ancient Serer Lamanes

References

Bibliography
 Sarr, Alioune. "Histoire du Sine-Saloum (Sénégal)." Introduction, bibliographie et notes par Charles Becker. Version légèrement remaniée par rapport à celle qui est parue en 1986-87 co 1985.
 Bressers, Hans &  Rosenbaum, Walter A., Achieving sustainable development: the challenge of governance across social scales, Greenwood Publishing Group, 2003 
 Ubink, Janine M, Hoekema, André J, Assies, Willem J, "Legalising Land Rights: Local Practices, State Responses and Tenure Security in Africa, Asia and Latin America", Amsterdam University Press, 2010. 
 Galvan, Dennis Charles, The State Must Be Our Master of Fire: How Peasants Craft Culturally Sustainable Development in Senegal, University of California Press, Berkeley, 2004 
 Faye, Louis Diène, Mort et naissance : le monde Sereer, Nouvelles Éditions africaines, 1983 
 Gastellu, Jean-Marc, L'égalitarisme économique des Serer du Sénégal, IRD Éditions, 1981 
Gravrand, Henry, La civilisation sereer, vol. II : Pangool, Nouvelles éditions africaines, Dakar, 1990, 
University of Wisconsin-Madison. African Studies Program, "African economic history, Volume 25", University of Wisconsin, African Studies Program (1997), p 28-9
Becker, Charles; Martin, Victor; & Ndène. Aloyse; (Révision et édition par Charles Becker), Traditions villageoises du Siin (2014), pp. 191–192

Jegan
Lamane
Serer patriarchs
Year of birth uncertain
11th-century monarchs in Africa